The Bumdeling Wildlife Sanctuary (also spelled Bumdelling or Bomdeling), which contains the former Kulong Chu Wildlife Sanctuary, covers  in northeastern Bhutan at elevations between  and . The sanctuary covers most of Trashiyangtse District, including Bumdeling Gewog. The sanctuary was planned in 1995 and established in 1998. It contains diverse flora, fauna, and scenery including alpine lakes and the Bumdeling Valley. The sanctuary also contains several cultural and religious sites. In the park live 3,000 resident households. The sanctuary is located in the basin of one of the largest rivers of Buthan and Kholong Chu, Drangme Chu.

The sanctuary has been identified as an Important Bird Area by BirdLife International because it supports black-necked cranes (it is one of the country's two wintering sites), wood snipes and grey-crowned prinias. As of 2007, there was a record of the white-tailed eagle, a first for the sanctuary. It is listed in Bhutan's Tentative List for UNESCO inclusion.

Ludlow's Bhutan Swallowtail, the only endemic butterfly in Bhutan and in the world, lives here.

See also
 List of protected areas of Bhutan
 Black-necked cranes in Bhutan

References

Eastern Himalayan broadleaf forests
Wildlife sanctuaries of Bhutan
Protected areas established in 1998
Lhuntse District
Mongar District
Trashiyangtse District
Important Bird Areas of Bhutan
Ramsar sites in Bhutan
Protected areas of Bhutan